Backfire is a 1988 mystery-thriller film about a murderous love triangle which forms between an affluent Vietnam War veteran, his wife, and another man. The film was directed by Gilbert Cates, and stars Karen Allen, Keith Carradine, Dean Paul Martin and Jeff Fahey. The film is dedicated to Martin, who died in a plane crash before the film was released.

Plot
Mara is married to Vietnam veteran Donny, who has horrible visions and nightmares of his combat experiences. Mara is having an affair with Jake, and the lives of all are disrupted when she meets a mysterious stranger, Reed.

Cast
 Keith Carradine as Reed
 Karen Allen as Mara
 Jeff Fahey as Donny
 Dean Paul Martin as Jake
 Bernie Casey as Clinton
 Dinah Manoff as Jill Tyson

References

External links
 
 
 
 

1988 films
1980s crime thriller films
American crime thriller films
Canadian crime thriller films
English-language Canadian films
Films directed by Gilbert Cates
Films scored by David Shire
ITC Entertainment films
1980s English-language films
1980s American films
1980s Canadian films